is a mountain on the border of the city of Minamibōsō, Chiba Prefecture, Japan with an altitude of . Mount Iyogatake is at the west of the Mineoka Mountain District of the Bōsō Hill Range, in close proximity to Mount Tomi. The mountain takes its name from its resemblance to Mount Ishizuchi in Ehime Prefecture, formerly in Iyo Province.

Mount Iyogatake is one of the few mountains in the Bōsō Hill Range with steep rock cliff. It can be easily climbed within 40 minutes. The entrance to the path of the mountain is between Heguri Elementary School and the Heguri Tenjin Shrine. Mount Iyogatake offers a clear view of the other mountains of the Bōsō Hill Range and Tokyo Bay, and on clear days Mount Fuji and the Izu Islands are also visible.

Mount Iyogatake and the Heguri Tenjin Shrine are associated with a legend of a tengu, a supernatural creature found in Japanese folklore.

Transportation 

The path to the peak of Mount Iyogatake is accessible by bus from the JR East  Uchibō Line Iwai Station in Minamibōsō.

Gallery

References 

Iyogatake